ADN (In English: DNA) (acronym: Actualidad, Deportes, Noticias, in English: News, Sports, News) is a Chilean radio station that broadcasts on 91.7 MHz FM in Santiago, Chile. ADN transmits across the entire country on channel 669 (with D-Box) of the cable operator VTR and via the internet worldwide. The station's voiceover is Fernando Solís Lara.

The station's signal reaches nearly all the national territory through 34 frequencies and is the only radio news network that transmits on the Easter Island.

The station combines contemporary adult music, news, sports, and current events, which makes it popular among a younger audience. Its target listeners are between the ages of 25 and 45.

ADN prides themselves on journalistic integrity, made possible by contributors Mauricio Hofmann, Mirna Schindler, Andrea Aristegui, Antonio Quinteros, Iván Núñez, Eduardo Fuentes Silva, Andrea Hoffmann, Sandra Zeballos, Carlos Costas, Francisco Mouat, Juan Cristóbal Guarello, Victor Cruces, Rodrigo Hernandez, Cristián Arcos and Danilo Díaz.

History 
The station began broadcasting on March 1, 2008. The station was named "ADN Radio Chile" in 2015, as a replacement for Radio W Chile, which had similar programming.

The first interview of ADN Radio Chile was broadcast on the program ADN Hoy. The interview was conducted on March 1, 2008 by Alejandro Guillier who interviewed the former President of Chile, Michelle Bachelet.

Broadcasters 

 Iván Núñez (present)
 Mauricio Hofmann 
 Mirna Schindler (January 2015 – present)
 Andrea Arístegui (January 2015 – present)
 * Antonio Quinteros (July 2016 – present)
 

 Diana Massis (May 2010 - December 2012, April 2014 - present)
 Eduardo Fuentes (present)
 José Antonio Neme current
 Sandra Zeballos
 César Peña current
 Alejandro Guillier retired
 Beatriz Sánchez retired
 Fernando Paulsen retired
 Matías del Río retired
 Patricio Cuevas ret
 Alejandra "Jani" Dueñas retired
 Armando Silva retired
 Luis Hernández

Slogans 
 2008-2009: La verdad que llevas dentro (The truth that you carry inside)
 2008–present (Sports): La pasión que llevamos dentro (The passion we carry inside)
 2009-October 2011: La nueva radio informativa del país (The country's new information radio)
 October 2011-January 2, 2015: ADN es noticia (ADN is news)
 January 2013-January 2, 2015: La radio del Chile de hoy (The radio of today's Chile)
 World Cup Brazil 2014: ADN es mundial (ADN is worldwide)
 October 2011 – present: Lo escuché en ADN (I heard it in ADN)
 January 2, 2015 – present: Somos actualidad, deportes y noticias para todo Chile (We are news, sports and news for all of Chile)
 April 2015 – February 2017: La verdad con todas sus letras (The truth with all its letters)

References

External links 

 Official website
 Ibero Americana Radio Chile
 PRISA

Radio stations in Chile
Mass media in Santiago
News and talk radio stations
Radio stations established in 2008
2008 establishments in Chile
Society of Chile